Legado Del Fantasma is a professional wrestling stable composed of leader Santos Escobar, Joaquin Wilde, Cruz Del Toro, Zelina Vega, and Rey Mysterio (associated). Currently performing in WWE on the SmackDown brand. The trio was formed in 2020 when El Hijo del Fantasma turned on Drake Maverick and joined forces with Wilde and Del Toro (then known as Raul Mendoza) and unmasked himself, thus changing his ring name to "Santos Escobar" and forming the group Legado Del Fantasma. As part of the group, Escobar was a one-time NXT Cruiserweight Champion.

On August 16, 2022, during the NXT Heatwave special, Tony D'Angelo defeated Escobar in a street fight, and per stipulation, he had to leave NXT. The following week he took the rest of the stable with him away from NXT, ending their tenure on the brand, and debuting on the main roster nearly two months later as part of SmackDown. After turning face and assisting Rey Mysterio in early 2023, Mysterio joined the group and began a feud with The Judgment Day.

History

Formation and Cruiserweight title reign (2020–2021) 
On the June 3, 2020 episode of NXT, El Hijo del Fantasma defeated Drake Maverick in the finals of a tournament to become the interim NXT Cruiserweight Champion due to outside interference by the two masked abductors who had attacked various cruiserweights. The following week, on NXT, Maverick congratulated Fantasma and demanded a title shot but then two masked men who had been attacking wrestlers randomly confronted the duo and then Fantasma turned on Maverick by attacking him and unmasked himself. He changed his name to "Santos Escobar" while the two masked men were revealed to be Joaquin Wilde and Raul Mendoza. On the night one of The Great American Bash, the trio was named "Legado del Fantasma". In their first match as a team, Legado del Fantasma defeated Maverick and Breezango in a six-man tag team match on the second night of The Great American Bash.

The group was focused on ensuring that Escobar retained the Cruiserweight Championship while Wilde and Mendoza also began competing in NXT's tag team division and 205 Live. At NXT TakeOver XXX, Wilde and Mendoza competed against Breezango (Fandango and Tyler Breeze) and the team of Oney Lorcan and Danny Burch in a triple threat match to determine the #1 contenders for the NXT Tag Team Championship. The match was won by Breezango. At the night one of Super Tuesday, Legado lost to Isaiah Scott and Breezango in a street fight when Scott pinned Escobar, leading up to a match between Escobar and Scott for Escobar's Cruiserweight Championship at NXT TakeOver 31, where Wilde and Mendoza assisted Escobar in retaining the title.

In 2021, Wilde and Mendoza entered the 2021 Dusty Rhodes Tag Team Classic in which they lost to the eventual winners MSK (Nash Carter and Wes Lee) in the semifinal round. They also faced MSK and Grizzled Young Veterans (James Drake and Zack Gibson) on night one of NXT TakeOver: Stand & Deliver in a match with the Tag Team titles on the line, which MSK won. On the night two of Stand & Deliver, Wilde and Mendoza assisted Escobar in defeating the reigning Cruiserweight Champion Jordan Devlin in a ladder match to become the undisputed Cruiserweight Champion. However, Escobar lost the title to Kushida on the April 13 episode of NXT. Escobar would fail to regain the title from Kushida in a two out of three falls match on the May 11 episode of NXT.

Introduction of Elektra Lopez and various feuds (2021–2022) 
At NXT TakeOver: In Your House, Legado del Fantasma would face NXT North American Champion Bronson Reed and NXT Tag Team champions MSK in a winners take all, six man tag team match in which Legado Del Fantasma would lose the match. On the August 24 episode of NXT, Elektra Lopez made her debut, helping Legado Del Fantasma win against Hit Row. On the September 28 episode of NXT, Lopez would defeat Hit Row's B-Fab in a no disqualification match and two weeks later, Escobar would fail to win the NXT North American Championship from Scott, ending the feud (Hit Row would get drafted to SmackDown in the WWE Draft). In early 2022, Escobar would feud with NXT Champion Bron Breakker, leading to a match between the two for the NXT Championship at Vengeance Day, where Escobar lost despite interference from Dolph Ziggler. At NXT Stand & Deliver, Escobar failed to win the NXT North American Championship in a ladder match. Shortly after Stand & Deliver, Legado Del Fantasma would feud with Tony D'Angelo, the self proclaimed "Don of NXT" and his "family". At this point, they would slowly turn into faces while portraying heelish tactics. After multiple meetings and kidnappings, Escobar defeated D'Angelo on the May 17 episode of NXT. However, at In Your House on June 4, Legado Del Fantasma lost to the D'Angelo Family (Tony D'Angelo, Stacks and Two Dimes) with the losers having to join the other person's family. With Legado joining the D'Angelo Family, they would accompany each other during matches with them usually losing. On the June 21 episode of NXT, Escobar cost D'Angelo his title match against NXT North American Champion Carmelo Hayes. At The Great American Bash on July 5, it was revealed that Escobar was hospitalized and the other members of Legado began working with The D'Angelo Family. On the August 2 episode of NXT, Escobar returned and cost D'Angelo and Stacks their title match against The Creed Brothers, signaling that their alliance has come to an end. D'Angelo and Escobar had one final meeting the following week where they agreed to a street fight for NXT Heatwave on August 16, stating that if Escobar wins, Legado would be free from The D'Angelo Family, but if D'Angelo wins, Escobar agrees to leave NXT with Legado. At Heatwave, D'Angelo defeated Escobar, signaling the end of his time on the brand. However on the following episode of NXT, Escobar appeared in a backstage segment inside a van. He would pick up the rest of his Legado teammates, and they would drive off, signaling that the stable had left NXT.

Main roster (2022–present) 
On the October 7 episode of SmackDown, Legado Del Fantasma (with Zelina Vega replacing Lopez) attacked Hit Row during their entrance, marking the group's main roster debut as heels.

At the Royal Rumble on January 28, Escobar entered his first Royal Rumble match at #10, but was eliminated by Brock Lesnar while Vega entered the women’s Royal Rumble match at #21 but was eliminated by Lacey Evans.

On the February 10 episode of SmackDown, Escobar competed in a fatal four-way match to determine the number #1 contender for the Intercontinental Championship, which was won by Madcap Moss. After the match in an off-air exclusive, Escobar approached Rey Mysterio, who also competed in the match, and showed respect. Escobar and Mysterio exchanged masks, starting a face turn.

Escobar became involved in Rey’s feud with his son, Dominik and The Judgment Day.  On the March 3 episode of SmackDown, Escobar was defeated by Dominik after interference from Rhea Ripley. After the match, Dominik tore up the mask Rey gave to Escobar, cementing the stable’s face turn. On the March 11, 2023 episode of Smackdown as Rey Mysterio gave his hall of fame speech he was interrupted by The Judgment Day. Only for Legado Del Fantasma to show up and assist Rey Mysterio. Legado Del Fantasma lost to Judgment Day in a six man Tag Team Match and since then, Mysterio would be associatrd with the group during his feud with The Judgement Day.

Championships and accomplishments
WWE
NXT Cruiserweight Championship (1 time) – Escobar

References

External links
Santos Escobar's WWE profile
Joaquin Wilde's WWE profile
Raul Mendoza's WWE profile
Legado Del Fantasma profile at Cagematch

WWE NXT teams and stables
WWE teams and stables